The 30th Weather Squadron was created on 29 August 1945, at Harmon Field.  During the 1940s and 1950s it was moved across several bases in Korea and Japan, inactivated and reactivated before inactivation on 8 August 1959.  As the Vietnam War began, the squadron was reactivated in 1962 at Tan Son Nhut AB where it remained until inactivation on 1 July 1971.  Reactivated again in 1976 at Yongsan AIN, Korea it remained until 1 June 1992.  One month later the squadron was reactivated a fifth time at the Vandenberg Air Force Base where it remains active today assigned to the 30th Operations Group, Air Force Space Command.

The squadron provides weather support for air operations on the base as well as space launches from 6 active launch complexes.

Lineage
 Constituted as the 30th Weather Squadron on 29 August 1945
 Activated on 20 September 1945
 Inactivated on 9 November 1949
 Activated on 16 November 1950
 Inactivated on 8 August 1959
 Activated on 5 October 1962 (not organized)
 Organized on 8 November 1962
 Inactivated on 1 July 1971
 Activated on 1 September 1976
 Inactivated on 1 June 1992
 Activated on 1 July 1992

Assignments

 2d Weather Group: 20 September 1945
 1st Weather Group: 1 August 1946
 1st Weather Group (later 2100th Air Weather Group): 3 June 1948
 2143d Air Weather Wing: 10 October 1949 -9 November 1949
 2143d Air Weather Wing: 16 November 1950
 1st Weather Wing 8 February 1954
 10th Weather Group: 18 February 1957 - 8 August 1959
 Military Air Transport Service,  5 October 1962 (not organized)
 1st Weather Wing: 8 November 1962
 1st Weather Group: 8 July 1966 - 1 July 1971
 1st Weather Wing: 1 September 1976
 Fifth Air Force: 1 October 1991 - 1 June 1992
 30th Operations Group: 1 July 1992 – present

Stations

 Harmon Field (later Harmon Air Force Base), 20 September 1945
 Andersen Air Force Base, 21 October 1949 - 9 November 1949
 Seoul, South Korea, 16 November 1950
 Taegu Air Base, South Korea, 22 December 1950
 Seoul, South Korea, 3 July 1951
 Osan Air Base, South Korea, 25 January 1954
 Moriyama Air Base, Japan, 9 May 1957
 Komaki Air Base, Japan, 5 July 1957
 Yamato Air Station, Japan, 10 March 1958 - 8 August 1959
 Tan Son Nhut Air Base, South Vietnam, 8 November 1962 - 1 July 1971
 Yong San Army Installation, Korea, 1 September 1976 - 1 June 1992
 Vandenberg Air Force Base, California, 1 July 1992 – present

See also 
 List of United States Air Force weather squadrons

References 

 45th Space Wing
 GlobalSecurity.org: 30th WS

External links 

 Air Force Weather Agency
 USAF

Weather 030
United States Air Force units and formations in the Korean War
Military units and formations in California
Military units and formations established in 1945